Frenzy is the fourth studio album by New Zealand new wave band Split Enz. Frenzy ventured even further beyond the band's art rock roots to more of a pop sound.

The album is notable for being the first to feature Neil Finn on lead vocals – though the lyrics to "Give It a Whirl" and both music & lyrics to "Master Plan" were written by his brother Tim.

Details
The album was primarily recorded at The Manor Studios in England between November and December in 1978; however, the song "I See Red" had already been recorded at Startling Studios (also in England) in July 1978.

There was a long delay between the writing of the songs and the recording. Tim Finn said, "We'd been waiting nearly a year to do it so we'd done all the demos, rehearsed it and written new songs. We'd been waiting too long. There's so much material. The album has twelve songs, but by the time we'd recorded it we'd written fifty more."

The song "Abu Dhabi" created controversy due to the use of phrases such as "greedy westerners" and "oil barons", considered to be racist by some. As a result, the song's vocals were mixed softly, the offensive lyrics were not printed anywhere on the album and with the exception of a few shouts of 'Abu Dhabi' left in, completely mixed out of the 2006 remix of the track.

The cover artwork was done by the band's then lighting director, Raewyn Turner. Tim Finn said, "We deliberately wanted something of us without the costumes. There's no need to promote our image anymore – it's our music that needs to be promoted".

Dissatisfaction with the original mix of the album led to Eddie Rayner remixing the album in 1981 for the North American and European releases. Side one comprised songs from the original release, while side two was a mix of songs recorded on the Rootin Tootin Luton Tapes from 1978. The sound of the original album apparently suffered from either bad tape stock used for the recording of the album, or misalignment of the tape machines used to record it – which limited what Rayner had to work with in the aforementioned 1981 remix. Release of the Rootin Tootin Luton Tapes finally eventuated in 2007 after many delays.

Subsequent developments in recording technology led to the remix of album track "Stuff and Nonsense" for the 1997 compilation Spellbound, and an entire remix of the album by Eddie Rayner released in 2006.  Although the remix was available for a short while after its release in 2006, it is now a rarity – with fans having to pay large sums of money to obtain it. Mushroom Records did not make the remixed album available in digital format.

Reception
Reviewed in Roadrunner at the time of release, it was described as, "a very mature and subtle piece of vinyl ... although not as immediately stunning as the stark Mental Notes or as smoothly polished as the sleek Second Thoughts. This a creative work of appreciable depth." Particularly praised were "I See Red", "Give It A Whirl" and "Hermit McDermitt" (for its "unique demented hillbilly sound").

Track listings
All tracks written by Tim Finn, except where noted. "I See Red" was not included on the first 10,000 copies of this album, having not been a part of the same sessions. It was added subsequently on 1 March 1979.

1979 release
Side One
 "I See Red"
 "Give It a Whirl" (T. Finn, N. Finn)
 "Master Plan"
 "Famous People"
 "Hermit McDermitt"
 "Stuff and Nonsense"
 "Marooned" (Rayner)

Side Two
 "Frenzy" (T. Finn, E. Rayner)
 "The Roughest, Toughest Game in the World"
 "She Got Body She Got Soul"
 "Betty"
 "Abu Dhabi" (T. Finn, E. Rayner)
 "Mind Over Matter" (T. Finn, N. Finn)

1981 release 
Some bootleg versions of the A&M 1981 Frenzy also include B-sides "Message Boy", "Hypnotized" and rare "Next Exit" – all recorded during the Luton sessions. "Stuff & Nonsense" is preceded by a brief introduction by Tim Finn, who dedicates the song to the New Zealand All Blacks rugby team. The original version of "Next Exit" from the Luton tapes was released on the More Hits and Myths compilation.
 "I See Red"
 "Give It a Whirl" 1981 remix (T. Finn, N. Finn)
 "Master Plan" 1981 remix
 "Betty" 1981 remix
 "Frenzy" 1981 remix (T. Finn, E. Rayner)
 "Stuff and Nonsense" 1981 remix with spoken dedication
 "Marooned" 1981 remix  (Rayner)
 "Hermit McDermitt" Luton version
 "Holy Smoke" (N. Finn)
 "Semi-Detached"
 "Carried Away" (N. Finn)
 "She Got Body, She Got Soul" 1981 remix
 "Mind Over Matter" Luton version (T. Finn, N. Finn)
 "Livin' It Up" (N. Griggs)

2006 release 
All tracks remixed in 2005–2006 by Eddie Rayner. The track listing on the CD booklet and back cover is incorrect on most editions.
 "Give It a Whirl" (T. Finn, N. Finn) – 3:04
 "I See Red" – 3:15
 "Famous People" – 3:02
 "Hermit McDermitt" – 4:03
 "Stuff and Nonsense" – 4:28
 "Mind Over Matter" (T. Finn, N. Finn) – 2:57
 "Marooned" (Rayner) – 2:32
 "Master Plan" – 3:07
 "She Got Body She Got Soul" – 2:58
 "The Roughest, Toughest Game in the World" – 3:44
 "Abu Dhabi" [Instrumental] (T. Finn, E. Rayner) – 5:23
 "Betty" – 4:45
 "Frenzy" (T. Finn, E. Rayner) – 2:30
 "Semi Detached" – 5:05
 "Carried Away" (N. Finn) – 4:34
 "Horse to Water" Frenzy session outtake – 3:06

Personnel 
Split Enz
 Tim Finn – vocals, acoustic guitar, piano
 Neil Finn – vocals, guitar
 Noel Crombie – percussion, backing vocals
 Eddie Rayner – keyboards, backing vocals, piano
 Malcolm Green – drums, backing vocals
 Nigel Griggs – bass, backing vocals

Charts

Certifications and sales

Release history

References

Split Enz albums
1979 albums
A&M Records albums
Mushroom Records albums
Albums produced by David Tickle